The North, Central American and Caribbean section of the 2018 FIFA World Cup qualification acted as qualifiers for the 2018 FIFA World Cup in Russia, for national teams which are members of the Confederation of North, Central American and Caribbean Association Football (CONCACAF). 3.5 slots (3 direct slots and 1 inter-confederation play-off slot) in the final tournament were available for CONCACAF teams.

In a change to previous qualification tournaments for this confederation, the first three rounds were played as knockout rounds, with both the fourth round and the final round (referred to as the "Hexagonal") played as group stages. The first round was played during the FIFA international dates of 23–31 March 2015. CONCACAF announced the full format details on 12 January 2015.

The United States failed to qualify for the World Cup finals for the first time since 1986 after a surprise defeat by Trinidad and Tobago. As a result, Panama reached the World Cup for the first time in their history.

Format
The qualification structure was as follows:
First round: 14 teams (lowest ranked teams were assigned spots 22–35) played home-and-away over two legs. The winners advanced to the second round.
Second round: 20 teams (second lowest ranked teams were assigned spots 9–21 and seven first round winners) played home-and-away over two legs. The winners advanced to the third round.
Third round: 12 teams (teams ranked 7–8 by CONCACAF and ten second round winners) played home-and-away over two legs. The winners advanced to the fourth round.
Fourth round: 12 teams (teams ranked 1–6 by CONCACAF and six third round winners) were divided into three groups of four teams to play home-and-away round-robin matches. The top two of each group advanced to the fifth round.
Fifth round: Six teams which had advanced from the fourth round played home-and-away round-robin matches in one group (often referred to as the "Hexagonal"). The top three qualified for the 2018 FIFA World Cup, and the fourth-placed team advanced to the inter-confederation play-offs.

Entrants
All 35 FIFA-affiliated national teams from CONCACAF entered qualification. The seeding – used to draw the first four rounds of the qualifiers – was based on the FIFA World Rankings of August 2014 (shown in parentheses).

Schedule
The schedule of the competition was as follows.

The inter-confederation play-offs were scheduled to be played between 6–14 November 2017.

First round

The draw for the first round was held on 15 January 2015, 19:40 EST (UTC−5), at the W Hotel at Miami Beach, Florida, United States.

Second round

The draw for the second round was held on 15 January 2015, 19:40 EST (UTC−5), at the W Hotel at Miami Beach, Florida, United States.

Third round

The draw for the third round was held as part of the 2018 FIFA World Cup Preliminary Draw on 25 July 2015, starting 18:00 MSK (UTC+3), at the Konstantinovsky Palace in Strelna, Saint Petersburg, Russia.

Fourth round

The draw for the fourth round was held as part of the 2018 FIFA World Cup Preliminary Draw on 25 July 2015, starting 18:00 MSK (UTC+3), at the Konstantinovsky Palace in Strelna, Saint Petersburg, Russia.

Groups

Group A

Group B

Group C

Fifth round

As with every World Cup qualification campaign since 1998, CONCACAF held a six-team, home-and-away round-robin group known as the 'Hexagonal', or 'Hex', as its final and decisive round. As a result of the abolition of the February and August fixtures from the FIFA calendar, the 'Hex' for the first time was not contained within a single calendar year, but instead began in November 2016 and concluded in October 2017.

The draw for the fifth round (to decide the fixtures) was held on 8 July 2016, 10:00 EDT (UTC−4), at the CONCACAF headquarters in Miami Beach, United States.

Inter-confederation play-offs

The draw for the inter-confederation play-offs was held as part of the 2018 FIFA World Cup Preliminary Draw on 25 July 2015, starting 18:00 MSK (UTC+3), at the Konstantinovsky Palace in Strelna, Saint Petersburg. The fourth-placed team from CONCACAF was drawn against the fifth-placed team from Asian Football Confederation (AFC), with the CONCACAF team hosting the first leg.

Qualified teams
The following three teams from CONCACAF qualified for the final tournament.

1 Italic indicates hosts for that year.

Top goalscorers

Notes

References

External links

Qualifiers – North, Central America and Caribbean, FIFA.com
World Cup Qualifying – Men, CONCACAF.com

 
CONCACAF
FIFA World Cup qualification (CONCACAF)
2014–15 in CONCACAF football
2015–16 in CONCACAF football
2016–17 in CONCACAF football
2017–18 in CONCACAF football